For Lovers Only may refer to:
 For Lovers Only (The Temptations album), 1995
 For Lovers Only (Marion Meadows album), 1990
 For Lovers Only (film), a 2011 romance film